John Purcell may refer to:

 John Purcell (author), Australian novelist
 John Purcell (VC) (1814–1857), Irish soldier in the British Army who received the Victoria Cross
 John Purcell (musician) (born 1952), American jazz saxophonist
 John Purcell (MP) (died 1665), Welsh politician
 John Baptist Purcell (1800–1883), Irish-born American prelate of the Roman Catholic Church